Thea Rabe (born 2 January 1995) is a Norwegian figure skater. Competing in ice dancing with American Timothy Koleto, she won the bronze medal at the 2015 Volvo Open Cup. As a single skater, she is a two-time Norwegian national junior champion (2013 and 2014).

Personal life 
Thea Rabe was born on 2 January 1995 in Tønsberg, Norway. She is the younger sister of Norwegian figure skater Anine Rabe.

Career

Single skating 
Rabe began learning to skate at the age of seven in 2002. Competing in ladies' singles, she won the Norwegian national junior title in the 2012–2013 and 2013–2014 seasons.

Ice dancing 
Rabe had tryouts with American ice dancer Timothy Koleto in November 2014 in Lyon, France, and the following month in Novi, Michigan, where he trained. They agreed to skate together for Norway. In May 2015, Rabe moved to the United States to train with Koleto. Igor Shpilband, Adrienne Lenda, Fabian Bourzat, and Greg Zuerlein coached the team in Novi, Michigan.

After being released by South Korea and sitting out one year, as required by the International Skating Union, Koleto became eligible to compete for Norway beginning October 20, 2015. Making their international debut, Rabe/Koleto won the bronze medal at the Volvo Open Cup in November 2015. They placed 8th at the Open d'Andorra and CS Warsaw Cup. Despite qualifying to the 2016 European Championships, they decided to end their partnership a few weeks before the event. They were Norway's first-ever ice dancing team.

Programs

With Koleto

Single skating

Competitive highlights 
CS: Challenger Series

Ice dancing with Koleto

Ladies' singles

References

External links 

1995 births
Living people
Sportspeople from Tønsberg
Norwegian female single skaters
21st-century Norwegian women